The WAGR T class was a class of 4-4-0 steam locomotives operated by the Great Southern Railway (GSR) and later Western Australian Government Railways (WAGR).

History
In 1887, Beyer, Peacock & Co, Manchester built a batch of six locomotives for the GSR. These were followed by four built by Kitson & Co, Leeds. As with all GSR locomotives they were named and not numbered or given a class designation.

All were included in the December 1896 takeover of the GSR by the WAGR and became the T class, numbered T164 to T173. They operated services from Albany through to Perth.

Withdrawals began in 1924 with the last remaining in service until 1952.

Class list
The numbers, names and periods in service of each member of the class were as follows:

Namesake
The T class designation was reused in the 1960s when the T class diesel locomotives entered service.

See also

History of rail transport in Western Australia
List of Western Australian locomotive classes

References

Notes

Cited works

External links

Beyer, Peacock locomotives
Kitson locomotives
Railway locomotives introduced in 1888
T WAGR class
3 ft 6 in gauge locomotives of Australia
4-4-0 locomotives
Passenger locomotives